Nanuet Senior High School is a public high school located in Nanuet, New York.  It is formally known as "Nanuet Senior High School: The John P. Burke Building," named after the school's long-time principal.   The Nanuet Senior High School houses grades 9 - 12.  Its leadership team consists of a Principal and two Assistant Principals.  In addition there are four guidance counselors, a Dean, a nurse, a student assistance counselor, a psychologist, a School Resource Officer, and department chairpersons. It is also a National Blue Ribbon School.

Nanuet's program offers courses in Art, English, French, Health, Math, Music, Physical Education, Science, Social Studies, Spanish and Technology.

Athletics

Mascot:

Athletic teams are usually referred to as the "Nanuet Golden Knights."

Sports Teams:

Cheerleading
Cross Country
Field Hockey (girls)
Football
Soccer
Tennis
Volleyball (girls)
Basketball
Bowling
Track and Field
Wrestling (boys)
Lacrosse
Golf
Softball (girls)
Baseball (boys)

Notable alumni
Charlie Adler: Known for his work on such cartoons as Tiny Toons and Rocko's Modern Life
Kenneth Kiesler:  American symphony orchestra and opera conductor
James Maritato:  professional wrestler known for his work with World Wrestling Entertainment and Extreme Championship Wrestling.
Ronald Thomas (cellist): American classical cellist
Scott Wittman: known for his work as a director, lyricist, and writer for Broadway, concerts, and television.

References

Public high schools in New York (state)
Schools in Rockland County, New York